Jagannath Prasad was an Indian politician belonging to the Indian National Congress. He was elected to the Lok Sabha the lower house of Indian Parliament from Mohanlalganj in Uttar Pradesh in 1984.

References

External links
 Official biographical sketch in Lok Sabha website

1921 births
India MPs 1984–1989
People from Lucknow district
Lok Sabha members from Uttar Pradesh
Possibly living people